The 8th PMPC Star Awards for Music (also known as the integral part of the 2016 Star For M-TV Awards, with the theme The Fusion of Philippine Entertainment’s Best) was organized by Philippine Movie Press Club headed by current president Fernan de Guzman and produced by Airtime Marketing Philippines, Inc. headed by Tessie Celestino-Howard. It was  held at the Novotel Manila, Araneta Center, Cubao, Quezon City on October 23, 2016.

The set of awards were given to Filipino music artists who have major contributions in promoting the Original Pilipino Music (OPM) industry for the past year.

Nominees and Winners
Here is the full set of nominees and winners of the 8th PMPC Star Awards for Music. The winners are highlighted with Boldface.

Concert of the Year
"All Request 5" – Jed Madela
"Birthday Concert" – Darren Espanto
"Flying High" – Kyla
"From The Top" – Sarah Geronimo
"Gary V. Presents" – Gary Valenciano
"Love Catcher" – Lani Misalucha
"Royals" – Regine Velasquez-Alcasid, Martin Nievera, Erik Santos, Angeline Quinto

Female Concert Performer of the Year
Angeline Quinto – "Royals"
Dulce – "The Timeless Diva"
Kyla – "Flying High"
Lani Misalucha – "Love Catcher"
Regine Velasquez-Alcasid – "Royals"
Sarah Geronimo – "From The Top"
Zsa Zsa Padilla – "Beginnings"

Female Recording Artist of the Year
Aiza Seguerra – "Araw-Gabi: Mga Awit ni Maestro Ryan" (Universal Records)
Donna Cruz – "Now and Forever" (Star Music)
Jolina Magdangal – "Back to Love" (Star Music)
Marion – "Marion" (Star Music)
Sarah Geronimo – "The Great Unknown (Viva Records)
Toni Gonzaga – "My Love Story" (Star Music)
Zsa Zsa Padilla – "Beginnings" (PolyEast Records)

Male Concert Performer of the Year
Arnel Pineda – "Love Rock N' Roll"
Darren Espanto – "Birthday Concert"
Erik Santos – "Royals"
Gary Valenciano – "Gary V. Presents"
Jed Madela – "All Request 5"
Mark Bautista – "Here Sings Love"
Martin Nievera – "Royals"

Male Recording Artist of the Year
Bamboo – "Bless This Mess" (PolyEast Records)
Darren Espanto – "Be With Me" (MCA Music)
Erik Santos – "Champion Reborn" (Star Music)
Jed Madela – "Iconic" (Star Music)
Jovit Baldivino – "JB Jukebox" (Star Music)
Martin Nievera – "Kahapon Ngayon" (PolyEast Records)
Ogie Alcasid – "Ikaw ang Buhay Ko" (Universal Records)

Best New Female Recording Artist of the Year
Alyssa Angeles – "Falling In Love" (Synergy Music)
Esang de Torres – "Ako Ay Kakanta" (MCA Music)
Janella Salvador – "Janella Salvador" (Star Music)
Maxine – "Maxine" (Ivory Music and Video)
Michelle Ortega – "Michelle Ortega" (Universal Records)
Pauline Cueto – "Pauline Cueto" (MCA Music)
Yassi Pressman – "Yassi" (Viva Records)

Best New Male Recording Artist of the Year
Bailey May – "Bailey" (Star Music)
Daryl Ong– "Daryl Ong" (Star Music)
Derrick Monasterio – "Derrick Monasterio" (GMA Records)
Idolito dela Cruz – "Ngayong Nandito Ka" (DB Energy Music Co.)
JC de Vera – "Stellar" (Ivory Music and Video)
Kenneth Ray Parsad – "Still" (Universal Records)
Matteo Guidicelli – "Matteo Guidicelli" (Star Music)

Music Video of the Year
"Bibitawan Ka" – Juris (Directed by Richmond Cadsawan)
"Cruisin'" – Christian Bautista and Julie Anne San Jose (Directed by Mark Reyes)
"Ipapadama Na Lang" – Matteo Guidicelli (Directed by Peewee Gonzales and Lloyd Corpuz)
"Kalsada" – Sam Concepcion (Directed by Miguel Tanchanco)
"Puso Kong Ito" – Edward Benosa (Directed by Carlo Obispo) (tied)
"Tayo" – Rivermaya (Directed by Musseli Cruz)
"Wag Kang Pabebe" – Vice Ganda (Directed by Jasper Salimbangon) (tied)

Pop Album of the Year
"Wish I May" – Alden Richards (GMA Records)
"I Feel Good" – Daniel Padilla (Star Music)
"Be With Me" –  Darren Espanto (MCA Music)
"Champion Reborn" – Erik Santos (Star Music)
"Jadine: On The Wings Of Love" – Nadine Lustre and James Reid (Viva Records)
"Marion" – Marion (Star Music)
"The Great Unknown" – Sarah Geronimo (Viva Records)

Male Pop Artist of the Year
Alden Richards – "Wish I May" (GMA Records) (tied)
Daniel Padilla – "I Feel Good" (Star Music)
Darren Espanto – "Be With Me" (MCA Music) (tied)
James Reid – "On the Wings of Love" (Viva Records)
Jovit Baldivino – "JB Jukebox" (Star Music)
Piolo Pascual – "The Breakup Playlist" (Star Music)
Sam Concepcion – "Bago" (Universal Records)

Female Pop Artist of the Year
Janella Salvador – "Janella Salvador" (Star Music)
Karylle – "A Different Playground" (PolyEast Records)
Kathryn Bernardo – "Christmas Duets" (Star Music)
Marion Aunor – "Marion" (Star Music)
Nadine Lustre – "Jadine: On The Wings Of Love" (Viva Records)
Sarah Geronimo – "The Great Unknown" (Viva Records)
Toni Gonzaga – "My Love Story" (Star Music)

Acoustic Album of the Year
"Araw-Gabi, Mga Awit Ni Maestro Ryan" – Aiza Seguerra (Universal Records)
"Bawat Daan" – Ebe Dancel (Star Music)
"Sa ‘Yo Lamang Papuri At Inspirasyon" – Noel Cabangon (Universal Records)
"TJ Monterde" – TJ Monterde (PolyEast Records)

Acoustic Artist of the Year
Aiza Seguerra – "Araw-Gabi, Mga Awit ni Maestro Ryan" (Universal Records)
Ebe Dancel – "Bawat Daan" (Star Music)
Noel Cabangon – "Sa’yo Lamang Papuri At Inspirasyon" (Universal Records)
TJ Monterde – "TJ Monterde" (PolyEast Records)

Revival Album of the Year
"Araw-Gabi, Mga Awit Ni Maestro Ryan" – Aiza Seguerra (Universal Records)
"Iconic" – Jed Madela (Star Music)
"Ikaw Ang Buhay Ko" – Ogie Alcasid (Universal Records)
"JB Jukebox" – Jovit Baldivino (Star Music)
"Kahapon Ngayon" – Martin Nievera (PolyEast Records)
"Nostalgia" – The Company (Universal Records)
"Now and Forever" – Donna Cruz (Star Music)

Dance Album of the Year
"Bago" – Sam Concepcion (Universal Records)
"Bailey" – Bailey May (Star Music)
"Be With You" – Darren Espanto (MCA Music)
"Classy Girls" – Classy Girls (LOP Production)
"#Hashtags" – Hashtags (Star Music)
"The Juans" – The Juans (Viva Records)
"Top One Project" – Top One Project (GMA Records)
"Zayaw Pilipinas" – Ron Antonio (MCA Records)

Album of the Year
"Back To Love" – Jolina Magdangal (Star Music)
"Be With You" – Darren Espanto (MCA Music)
"Bless This Mess" – Bamboo (PolyEast Records)
"Marion" – Marion (Star Music)
"The Great Unknown" – Sarah Geronimo (Viva Records)
"Wish I May" – Alden Richards (GMA Records)
"Nando’n Ako" – Willie Revillame (GMA Records)

Song of the Year
"Gusto Kita" – Bailey May (Star Music)
"Home" – Darren Espanto (MCA Music)
"Nando’n Ako" – Willie Revillame (GMA Records)
"Maghihintay Ako" – Jona (Star Music)
"Tala" – Sarah Geronimo (Viva Records)
"Take A Chance" – Marion (Star Music)
"Wish I May" – Alden Richards (GMA Records)

Duo/Group of the Year
Callalily – "Greetings From Callalily" (Universal Records)
Never The Strangers – "Screenburn" (Universal Records)
"T.O.P." – "Top One Project" (GMA Records)
Silent Sanctuary – "Langit. Luha" (Ivory Music And Video )
Six Part Invention – "Always And Ever" (Universal Records)
The Company – "Nostalgia" (Universal Records)
The Juans – "The Juans" (Viva Records)

Rock Album of the Year
"Avalon Beyond" – Avalon Beyond (Pulp Live Records)
"Bless This Mess" – Bamboo (PolyEast Records)
"Dating Gawi" – Rico Blanco (Universal Records)
"Debris" – Sandwich (PolyEast Records)
"Greetings From Callalily" – Callalily (Universal Records)
"Langit. Luha." – Silent Sanctuary (Ivory Music And Videos)
"Screenburn" – Never The Strangers (Universal Records)

Rock Artist of the Year
Avalon Beyond – "Avalon Beyond" (Pulp Live Records)
Bamboo – "Bless This Mess" (PolyEast Records)
Callalily – "Greetings From Callalily" (Universal Records)
Never The Strangers  – "Screenburn" (Universal Records)
Rico Blanco – "Dating Gawi" (Universal Records)
Sandwich – "Debris" (Polyeast Records)
Silent Sanctuary – "Langit. Luha." (Ivory Music And Videos)

R&B Album of the Year
"Daryl Ong" – Daryl Ong (Star Music)
"Jason Dy" – Jason Dy (MCA Records)
"Most Requested Playlist" – Kris Lawrence (Universal Records)

R&B Artist of the Year
Daryl Ong – "Daryl Ong" (Star Music)
Kris Lawrence – "Most Requested Playlist" (Universal Records)
Jason Dy  – "Jason Dy" (MCA Records)

Compilation Album of the Year
"Gold" – Gary Valenciano (Universal Records)
"Aldub Is Forever" (Universal Records)
"Theme Song Compilation" (Star Music)
"Himig Handog P-Pop Love Songs" (Star Music)
"Bituin Walang Ningning" – Mark Bautista and Cris Villongco (Viva Records)

Cover Design of the Year
"Araw-Gabi, Mga Awit Ni Maestro Ryan Cayabyab" – Aiza Seguerra (Universal Records)
"I Feel Good" – Daniel Padilla (Star Music)
"Be With You" – Darren Espanto (MCA Music)
"Now and Forever" – Donna Cruz (Star Music)
"Gold" – Gary Valenciano (Universal Records)
"Iconic" – Jed Madela (Star Music)
"Back To Love" – Jolina Magdangal (Star Music)
"The Great Unknown" –  Sarah Geronimo (Viva Records)

Special awards

Pilita Corrales Lifetime Achievement Award
 Dulce

Parangal Levi Celerio
 Vicente "Vic" del Rosario, Jr. (Viva Records)

Stars of the Night
 Arjo Atayde and Ria Atayde

See also
30th PMPC Star Awards for Television

References

2016 music awards
Philippine music awards